William Henry Sharpe (April 19, 1868 – April 19, 1942) was a Canadian merchant and political figure in Manitoba, Canada. He represented Lisgar in the House of Commons of Canada from 1908 to 1915 as a Conservative. Sharpe sat for Manitou division in the Senate of Canada from 1916 to 1942.

He was born in Scott Township, Ontario, the son of George Sharpe and Mary Ann Simpson, and was educated in Uxbridge and Belleville. He established himself as a merchant in Manitou, Manitoba. He was married twice: to Cora Alice Bustin in 1891 and to Ida J. Armstrong in 1900.  Sharpe raised the 184th Battalion, CEF that served overseas during World War I, serving as lieutenant-colonel. He was a member of the city council for Manitou from 1901 to 1907 and was mayor in 1908. He resigned his seat in the House of Commons in 1915 to run unsuccessfully for a seat in the provincial assembly. He died in office in Ottawa at the age of 74.

His brother Samuel Simpson Sharpe also served in the House of Commons.

References

Members of the House of Commons of Canada from Manitoba
Conservative Party of Canada (1867–1942) MPs
Canadian senators from Manitoba
Mayors of places in Manitoba
1868 births
1942 deaths
People from Manitou, Manitoba
People from Uxbridge, Ontario